Technopolis or variants may refer to:

Technopolis or Technology Park are synonyms for science park
Technopolis (Belgium), a Flemish science center and activity museum in Mechelen, Belgium
Technopolis (Gazi), a City of Athens enterprise to protect the Gazi Industrial Park in Greece
Technopolis Innovation Park Delft, a science park in Delft, the Netherlands\
Technopolis Oyj, a corporation listed on the Helsinki Stock Exchange that operates science parks in several cities of Finland
"Technopolis", a song by Yellow Magic Orchestra.
Technopolis Soft, re-branded as Game Technopolis, was the video game brand of Tokuma Shoten.
Tecnópolis, an Argentine science and technology park in Villa Martelli, Buenos Aires Province
Technopolis (retailer), electronics retailer in Bulgaria